Archibald Primrose, Lord Dalmeny (2 October 1809 – 23 January 1851), was a British Liberal politician.

Origins
He was the eldest son and heir apparent of Archibald Primrose, 4th Earl of Rosebery (1783–1868), whom he predeceased, by his wife Harriett Bouverie.

Education
Dalmeny was educated at Harrow School and Trinity College, Cambridge.

Career
Dalmeny was a supporter of the Reform Act 1832, and became a Member of Parliament for Stirling Burghs in the elections held that year after the passage of the bill. From 25 April 1835 until the fall of Melbourne's Second Government in 1841, Dalmeny was a Civil Lord of the Admiralty. In Parliament, he opposed both the secret ballot and the income tax. He did not contest the seat in 1847, and left Parliament.

Marriage and progeny
On 20 September 1843 he married Lady Catherine Lucy Wilhelmina Stanhope (1819–1901), a historian, the daughter of Philip Stanhope, 4th Earl Stanhope, by whom he had four children:
Lady Mary Catherine Constance Primrose (19 Nov 1844– 3 September 1935), who on 8 October 1885 married Henry Walter Hope-Scott.
Hon. Constance Evelyn Primrose ( 1 May 1846 – 27 June 1939), who on 15 Jul 1867 married Henry Wyndham, 2nd Baron Leconfield.
Archibald Primrose, 5th Earl of Rosebery (1847–1929), Prime Minister of the United Kingdom 1894–1895.
Everard Henry Primrose (1848–1885), a Colonel in the Grenadier Guards and the Military Attaché at Vienna.

After Lord Dalmeny's death, Lady Dalmeny married secondly Harry Powlett, 4th Duke of Cleveland (1803–1891) in 1854.

Death
Dalmeny fell ill with pleurisy during the Christmas season of 1850, and while apparently recovering in January, died suddenly of heart failure.

References

External links
 

1809 births
1851 deaths
People educated at Harrow School
Alumni of Trinity College, Cambridge
British courtesy barons and lords of Parliament
Heirs apparent who never acceded
Scottish Liberal Party MPs
Lords of the Admiralty
Members of the Parliament of the United Kingdom for Scottish constituencies
UK MPs 1832–1835
UK MPs 1835–1837
UK MPs 1837–1841
UK MPs 1841–1847
Vice-Lieutenants of Linlithgowshire
Members of the Parliament of the United Kingdom for Fife constituencies
19th-century Scottish politicians
Members of the Parliament of the United Kingdom for Stirling constituencies
Parents of prime ministers of the United Kingdom
Archibald